World of Hell (or simply WoH) was a grey hat computer hacker group that claims to be responsible for several high-profile attacks in the year 2001. It gained attention due to its high-profile targets and the lighthearted messages it has posted in the aftermath of its attacks.

Overview
World of Hell first emerged in March 2001, and has successfully attacked the websites of several major corporations. It specializes in finding websites with poor security, and then defacing it with an advice message. It has used well-known zero day exploits in that period of time.

The group has used the motto "Kiss my a$$ because I 0wn3d yours" in several cases of vandalism but has also used humorous pictures aimed at war, corruption, or other hackers.

World of Hell was also involved in the cyberwarfare "Project-China".

Members
Cowhead2000, RaFa, FonE_TonE, foney, no|d, dawgyg, Slacker, Messiah-x, Azap, Rubix, goof-athon, delta-x, d1ckw33d, PeCo, JoeGoeL, Divine, x[beast]x, Apocalypse, gl0b4l, spyR0cker.

Supposed attacks
Defense Information Systems Agency, Rolex, FOIA CIA, PFIZER, Hard Rock Cafe, Virginia State, Microsoft, around 700 sites in one minute, etc.

Convictions
In 2001 Robert Junior aka Cowhead2000 was arrested. On June 12, 2002 Thomas DeVoss aka dawgyg was arrested. In 2005 Rafael Núñez aka RaFa was arrested. The fate of the other members is currently unknown.

References

External links

Cyberattacks
Internet-based activism
Internet vigilantism
Hacker groups
Hacking in the 2000s